The Central Committee of the 3rd Congress of the Russian Social Democratic Labour Party was in session from April to December 1905.

Plenums
The Central Committee was not a permanent institution. It convened plenary sessions and meetings. Three meetings were held between the 2nd Congress and the 1st Conference. When the CC was not in session, decision-making power was vested in the internal bodies of the CC itself; that is, the Politburo, Secretariat and Orgburo. None of these bodies were permanent either; typically they convened several times a month.

Composition

Members

Candidates

References

Citations

Bibliography
 

Central Committee elected by the 04
1905 establishments in the Russian Empire
1905 disestablishments in the Russian Empire